16
This is a list of equipment used by the Armed Forces of Bosnia and Herzegovina.

Small arms

Armor

References 

 
Bosnia and Herzegovina